Man Crazy is a 1997 novel by Joyce Carol Oates.

Man Crazy may also refer to:

Man Crazy (1953 film), directed by Irving Lerner
Man Crazy (1927 film), an American comedy film directed by John Francis Dillon

See also
"Crazy Man, Crazy", 1953 song by Bill Haley & His Comets
The Crazy Man, 2005 Canadian children's novel by Pamela Porter